Al Balushi (alternatively Baloushi, Balooshi, Bloushi, Blushi or Blooshi) is a tribal surname common in the Persian Gulf region, particularly Oman, the United Arab Emirates, Kuwait, Qatar, Bahrain and Saudi Arabia. It is a nisba and is Arabized from the term Balochi, denoting someone who has Baloch ancestry.
The Baloch people are of Iranian stock and the language a branch of Indo-Iranian languages. People carrying this surname trace their tribal origins to Balochistan, a region in south Iran and Pakistan located across the Persian Gulf. Their ancestors predominantly came from the Makran coast in the 19th century. The Al Balushi speak Arabic, while some also use Balochi or Persian. They are mainly Sunni Muslims. They are a populous tribe in Oman, the UAE and Bahrain.

People
 Sportspeople
 Ali Al-Balochi, Emirati footballer
Ali Al-Baluchi, Kuwaiti boxer
Ali Mohamed Al-Balooshi, Emirati middle-distance runner
Ayesha Al-Balooshi, Emirati weightlifter
Azan Al-Balushi, Omani footballer
 Hamed Al-Balushi, Omani footballer
 Issa Ali Al-Bloushi, Emirati footballer
 Jamal Nabi Al-Balushi, Omani footballer
Khalid Abdulla Al-Balochi, Emirati footballer
Khalid Al-Balochi, Emirati footballer
Hamad Al-Balochi, Emirati footballer
Mansoor Al-Balochi, Emirati footballer
 Mohammed Al-Balushi, Omani footballer
 Mohammed Al-Balochi, Emirati footballer
 Muheeb Al-Balushi, Omani footballer
 Rayan Al-Bloushi, Saudi Arabian footballer
 Talal Al-Bloushi, Qatari footballer
Wadha Al-Balushi, Omani sports shooter
Walid Abbas Al Balushi, Emirati footballer
Yaqoub Al-Balochi, Emirati footballer

 Miscellaneous
 Ammar al-Baluchi, prisoner at Guantanamo Bay detention camp
Fatima bint Mohammed Al Balooshi, Bahraini politician
Mai Al Balushi, Kuwaiti actress
 Salah Abdul Rasool Al Blooshi, Bahraini Guantanamo detainee

See also
 Baloch people in the United Arab Emirates

Notes

References

Arabic-language surnames
Al Balushi
Al Balushi
Tribes of Arabia
Tribes of the United Arab Emirates
Nisbas